Sailing Away may refer to:

 "Sailing Away" (All of Us song)
 "Sailing Away", a song by Chris de Burgh from Flying Colours

See also 
 Sail Away (disambiguation)
 Come Sail Away